Nisshin Station may refer to either of the following railway stations in Japan:
 Nisshin Station (Aichi) on the Meitetsu Toyota Line
 Nisshin Station (Saitama) on the Kawagoe Line
 Nisshin Station (Hokkaidō) on the Sōya Main Line